The Doppelganger: Literature's Philosophy is a 2010 book by Dimitris Vardoulakis in which the author examines the relationship between literature and philosophy.

References

External links 
 The Doppelganger: Literature's Philosophy

2010 non-fiction books
Fordham University Press books
Philosophy books
Philosophy of literature
Theses